Hermitage railway station was a railway station on the Didcot, Newbury and Southampton Railway which served the villages of Hermitage and Oare in Berkshire. The station closed in 1962. The station house remains and is occupied by a scaffolding company. The adjacent site became a light industrial site and was occupied by the Arena Seating Company. The Arena Seating site was subsequently re-developed for housing in 2006–07. The residential development is named Hermitage Green.

Facilities
Hermitage station was built with two platforms including a passing loop with the ticket office and station buildings located on the northbound platform. A goods shed and crane were located next to two sidings south of the station. In 1942, several sidings were built further to the south of the station to provide access to a cold store.

The site today
The adjoining bridge over the road serving the village was completely removed in 1979. The station building is used as a private dwelling. There are still platforms in existence behind the station building. The 1942 sidings and cold store have been demolished and the site turned into an area of housing.

Services

References 

Disused railway stations in Berkshire
Former Great Western Railway stations
Railway stations in Great Britain opened in 1882
Railway stations in Great Britain closed in 1942
Railway stations in Great Britain opened in 1943
Railway stations in Great Britain closed in 1962